USS Christiana (YAG-32), originally given the hull classification symbol IX-80 as an unclassified miscellaneous vessel, was a seaplane tender and was the only ship of the United States Navy to be given that name.  Her keel was laid down by Johnson Foundry, on New York, New York, in 1892. She served in World War I as Azalea, former United States Lighthouse Service tender, was taken over by the Navy in August 1942 and commissioned on 9 November 1942. She was reclassified YAG-32 on 20 November 1943.

Christiana served as a seaplane tender in the British West Indies, providing vital services to the aircraft flying patrols in the Caribbean Sea. She moved from base to base as the focus of antisubmarine activity shifted throughout the area. Christiana was decommissioned at Miami, Florida, on 28 July 1945, and transferred to the Maritime Commission on 25 February 1946.

See also
USLHT Azalea

References

External links
 Photo gallery at navsource.org

Seaplane tenders of the United States Navy
Ships built in New York City
1892 ships
Lighthouse tenders of the United States